Dejeaniops is a genus of bristle flies in the family Tachinidae. There are at least three described species in Dejeaniops.

Species
These three species belong to the genus Dejeaniops:
 Dejeaniops beckeri Engel, 1920 c g
 Dejeaniops fallaciosus Engel, 1920 c g
 Dejeaniops ollacheus Townsend, 1913 c g
Data sources: i = ITIS, c = Catalogue of Life, g = GBIF, b = Bugguide.net

References

Further reading

External links

 
 

Tachinidae